Kofi Boakye Yiadom (died February 2, 2020), known by his stage name Kofi B,  was a Ghanaian highlife musician. He was known for songs such as "Mmobrowa", "Bantama Kofi Boakye" and "Koforidua Flowers", among others. He was inspired by the likes of Amakye Dede, Kojo Antwi and Ofori Amponsah.

Education 
Kofi B attended Agogo State College in the Ashanti Region, but dropped out prematurely due to financial difficulties.

Death 
Kofi B suffered a heart attack prior to performing at a concert in Cape Coast on February 2, 2020, and was pronounced dead on arrival after being rushed to a hospital. He had been battling health issues over the past year.

Discography 

 Taxi Driver
 Twa Me Keke
 Aserewa
 The Return of Kofi B
 Afia Donkor
 Brenya
 Bantama Kwasi Boakye

References 

Ghanaian highlife musicians
21st-century Ghanaian musicians
2020 deaths
Place of birth missing
Year of birth missing
People from Central Region (Ghana)